John Newcombe and Tony Roche successfully defended their title, defeating Ken Rosewall and Fred Stolle in the final, 10–8, 6–3, 6–1 to win the gentlemen's doubles title at the 1970 Wimbledon Championships.

Seeds

  John Newcombe /  Tony Roche (champions)
  Tom Okker /  Marty Riessen (quarterfinals)
  Roy Emerson /  Rod Laver (quarterfinals)
  Bob Hewitt /  Frew McMillan (semifinals)
  Bob Lutz /  Stan Smith (third round)
  Ken Rosewall /  Fred Stolle (final)
  Cliff Drysdale /  Roger Taylor (third round)
  Bill Bowrey /  Owen Davidson (third round)

Draw

Finals

Top half

Section 1

Section 2

Bottom half

Section 3

Section 4

References

External links

1970 Wimbledon Championships – Men's draws and results at the International Tennis Federation

Men's Doubles
Wimbledon Championship by year – Men's doubles